Goodenia perryi is a species of flowering plant in the family Goodeniaceae and is endemic to the south-west of Western Australia. It is an ascending herb or shrub with silvery hairs, lance-shaped leaves at the base of the plant and racemes of blue flowers.

Description
Flowering occurs around October.

Taxonomy and naming
Goodenia perryi was first formally described in 1990 by Roger Charles Carolin in the journal Telopea from a specimen collected by Charles Gardner at Bunjil in 1961. The specific epithet (perryi) probably honours Dick Perry, a forester who worked with Gardner.

Distribution and habitat
This goodenia grows in yellow sand near Bunjil in the Avon Wheatbelt and Yalgoo biogeographic regions of south-western Western Australia.

Conservation status
Goodenia perryi is classified is classified as "Priority Three" by the Government of Western Australia Department of Parks and Wildlife meaning that it is poorly known and known from only a few locations but is not under imminent threat.

References

perryi
Eudicots of Western Australia
Plants described in 1990
Taxa named by Roger Charles Carolin
Endemic flora of Australia